Kisiba is an administrative ward in the Rungwe district of the Mbeya Region of Tanzania. In 2016 the Tanzania National Bureau of Statistics report there were 7,306 people in the ward, from 6,629 in 2012.

Villages and hamlets 
The ward has 4 villages, and 14 hamlets.

 Busisya
 Busilya
 Busisya
 Butumba
 Isabula
 Ikama
 Ikomelo
 Isabula Chini
 Isabula Juu
 Iseselo
 Lwifwa
 Iseselo juu
 Lugombo
 Lwifwa
 Mbaka
 Kibundugulu
 Landani
 Mibula

References 

Wards of Mbeya Region